J.H. Bruns Collegiate is a secondary school in Winnipeg, Manitoba, Canada established in 1972. It has approximately 790 students from grades 9 to 12. It offers a varied curriculum with a total of 130 courses.

History 
The school was named after Brother Joseph H. Bruns S.M., who was as an educator and superintendent in St. Boniface. The school opened in Southdale in September 1972. Initially, J. H. Bruns shared its gymnasium and sports facilities with the Southdale Recreation Association. During this period, the school functioned as a middle school offering grades 5 to 8, with higher grades being added each year thereafter. On October 30, 1975, a fire occurred at J. H. Bruns Collegiate. By the spring of 1976 classrooms were renovated, and a new wing was added to the school, which included the Industrial Arts and Human Ecology facility.

Principals 
Mr. G. A. Guilbault, Principal 1972 - 1975
Mr. Moe Oye, Vice-Principal 1972 - 1979, 1980 - 1996
Mr. Hank Neufeld, Principal 1975 - 1980
Mr. Peter Janzen, Principal 1980 - 1996
Mr. Moe Oye, Vice-Principal 1980 - 1996
Mr. Neil Johnson, Principal 1996 - 2001
Ms Gail Atkins, Vice Principal 1996 - 2002
Mr. Bob Town, Principal 2001 - 2013
Ms Irene Nordheim, Vice Principal 2002 - 2005
Ms Marilyn Thorington, Vice Principal 2005 - 2006
Ms Karen Haluschak, Vice Principal 2006 - 2009
Mr. Ray Houssin, Vice Principal 2007 - 2010
Ms Patti Field, Vice Principal 2009 - 2011
Mr. Curt Krahn, Vice Principal 2010 - 2014
Ms Charlene Smallwood, Vice Principal 2011 - 2015
Mr. Henri Péloquin, Principal 2013 - 2018
Mr. Greg Meade, Vice Principal 2014 - 2016
Ms Julie Côté-Marinelli, Vice Principal 2015 - 2018
Mr. Joel Shimoji, Vice Principal 2016 - 2020
Ms Julie Côté-Marinelli, Principal 2018 - 2018
Mrs. Carrie Schimnowski, Vice Principal 2018 - 2018
Mr. Ralph Wagner, Principal 2018 - 2019
Ms Julie Côté-Marinelli, Vice Principal 2018 - 2019
Ms Elaine Solinski, Vice Principal 2019 - 2021
Ms Julie Côté-Marinelli, Principal 2019 - 2022
Mrs. Carrie Schimnowski, Vice Principal 2020 - 2022
Ms Sheila Lynch-Mondor, Vice Principal 2021 - 2022
Ms Megan Vankoughnett, Principal 2022 - Present
Ms Ingrid Pedersen, Vice Principal 2022 - Present
Ms Jennifer Sloan, Vice Principal 2022 - Present

High schools in Winnipeg
Educational institutions established in 1972
1972 establishments in Manitoba
Saint Boniface, Winnipeg